Cherry Jones is an American actress of the stage and screen.

She has received five Tony Awards nomination for Best Actress in a Play winning twice for The Heiress in 1995 and Doubt in 2005. She has also received three Drama Desk Awards, two Obie Awards, and an Outer Critics Circle Award. She received a Laurence Olivier Award for Best Actress in a Play nomination for her performance in The Glass Menagerie in 2017.

She has also received four Primetime Emmy Award nominations winning three for 24 in 2009, The Handmaid's Tale in 2018, and Succession in 2019.

Major associations

Emmy Awards

Tony Awards

Laurence Olivier Awards

Screen Actors Guild Awards

Theatre awards

Drama Desk Awards

Drama Critics Circle Awards

Obie Award

Outer Critics Circle Awards

Television awards

Critics' Choice Awards

Miscellaneous awards

GLAAD Media Awards

Satellite Awards

References 

Jones, Cherry